JoCasta Zamarripa (born March 8, 1976) is an American politician and former member of the Wisconsin State Assembly.  A Democrat, she represented the 8th assembly district for 10 years.  She is now a member of the Milwaukee Common Council. Prior to winning elective office, Zamarripa worked as an outreach coordinator for Planned Parenthood.

Biography

Born in Milwaukee, Wisconsin, Zamarripa graduated from the University of Wisconsin–Milwaukee in 2005. She was elected to the 8th Wisconsin State Assembly district in 2010. Previously, she had worked as an outreach coordinator at Planned Parenthood of Wisconsin. In the heavily Democratic 8th district, Zamarripa has never faced a significant challenge outside the Democratic primary election. In 2010, 2012 and 2014, she faced repeated unsuccessful challenges in that primary from Laura Manriquez. Otherwise, her only ballot opposition was a 2010 effort by independent Ramona Rivas (although Manriquez mounted a write-in campaign). In each election, Zamarripa won 83% or more of the general election vote.

In a July 2012 interview with the Milwaukee Journal Sentinel, she announced that she is bisexual. She was one of four openly LGBT members of the Wisconsin Legislature, alongside Senator Tim Carpenter (D–Milwaukee) and Representatives Mark Spreitzer (D–Beloit) and Todd Novak (R–Dodgeville). In 2014, she was included as part of the annual "40 under 40" list in The Advocate.

In 2017, Zamarripa attended Harvard University's John F. Kennedy School of Government program for Senior Executives in State and Local Government as a David Bohnett LGBTQ Victory Institute Leadership Fellow.

References

External links
 
 
 Campaign website

University of Wisconsin–Milwaukee alumni
Women state legislators in Wisconsin
1976 births
Hispanic and Latino American state legislators in Wisconsin
Hispanic and Latino American women in politics
Living people
Bisexual politicians
Bisexual women
LGBT state legislators in Wisconsin
LGBT people from Wisconsin
2012 United States presidential electors
Politicians from Milwaukee
21st-century American politicians
21st-century American women politicians
American politicians of Mexican descent
Democratic Party members of the Wisconsin State Assembly